The Man Who Quit Smoking is a 1972 Swedish comedy film directed by Tage Danielsson, starring Gösta Ekman, Grynet Molvig, Carl-Gustaf Lindstedt and Gunn Wållgren. The film is known as a Hasse & Tage film and is a great cult classic in Sweden.

Plot
The plot focuses on Dante Alighieri, a young man who loves smoking. When his father dies Dante inherits 17 million kr on one special condition: He must give up smoking in 14 days and then stay smoke-free for an entire year. If he fails, his uncle inherits the 17 million instead. Dante has a living hell while trying to quit, and hires a private detective agency called Little Secret Service who he gives free hands to stop him from smoking. At the same time, his uncle (who has taken up smoking himself) does everything he can to make Dante smoke again.

Production
Tage Danielsson originally came up with the idea for this movie when he himself decided to quit smoking. If he made a movie about the subject he thought it would be too embarrassing if he ever started again. Another inspiration was Dante Alighieri's Divine Comedy. The main character is named Dante and his loved one is called Beatrice, just as in The Divine Comedy. The plot is also divided into three parts: Inferno, Purgatorio and Paradiso.

Cast
 Gösta Ekman as Dante Alighieri
 Grynet Molvig as Beatrice Morris
 Toivo Pawlo as Hugo Alighieri
 Olga Georges-Picot as Gunhild
 Holger Löwenadler as Knut-Birger
 Gunn Wållgren as Aunt Gunhild
 Olle Hilding as Sjöström
 Carl-Gustaf Lindstedt as Detective
 Pierre Lindstedt as Detective
 Marianne Stjernqvist as Mrs. Jonsson-Varin
 Jan-Olof Strandberg as Doctor
 Raymond Bussières as The French detective
 Margaretha Krook as Prostitute
 Jytte Abildstrøm as Lady
 Stig Ossian Ericson as Hypnotist doctor
 Manne Grünberger as Major
 Putte Kock as TV commentator

Awards
At the 9th Guldbagge Awards in 1973 Gösta Ekman won the award for Best Actor.

See also
 Dante Alighieri and the Divine Comedy in popular culture

References

External links

1972 films
1972 comedy films
Swedish comedy films
1970s Swedish-language films
Films directed by Tage Danielsson
1970s Swedish films